The Guatemalan ambassador in Taipei is the official representative of the Government in Guatemala City to the Government of Taiwan.

History 
In 1935 diplomatic relations between the governments of Guatemala and the Republic of China were established, when the Consulate General of the Republic of China was installed in Guatemala City. 
In 1954 the rank of the representation rose from Consulate General to Legation.
In 1960 the rank of the representation rose from Legation to Embassy.

List of representatives

References 

 
China
Guatemala